Wikimarketing is the term used to refer to marketing techniques or tools trying to exploit wikis to increase "brand recognition" (brand awareness), through creation and updating of articles of a product or company. The most used wiki is Wikipedia. It is a type of online marketing and the term started to be used with several meanings in 2008. Other sources classify it as new media marketing under the term wiki marketing.

Types 
Three wikimarketing techniques can be differentiated:
 Create content within a wiki
 Add links to wiki (Link building)
 Creation of your own wiki

Controversy 

There are currently public relations or online marketing companies that offer wikimarketing services. There have been several conflicts between these companies and the Wikimedia Foundation, where there are different opinions about paid editions in Wikipedia.

Since June 2014 the Wikimedia Foundation allows paid editions as long as they are revealed according to the terms of use and local Wikipedia policies
you must disclose your employer, client, and affiliation with respect to any contribution for which you receive, or expect to receive, compensation. You must make that disclosure in at least one of the following ways:
 a statement on your user page,
 a statement on the talk page accompanying any paid contributions, or
 a statement in the edit summary accompanying any paid contributions.

Also in June 2014, 11 public relations companies signed a statement agreeing to comply with Wikipedia's policies on conflict-of-interest editing.

See also 

 Conflict of interest editing on Wikipedia
 Marketing
 Market segmentation
 Digital marketing
 Online advertising
 Search engine marketing
 Search engine optimization
 Social media marketing
 Social media optimization
 Wikipedia:Paid-contribution disclosure
 "My WikiBiz", Wikipedia Signpost, 9 October 2006. 
 "Paid editing", Wikipedia Signpost, 15 June 2009. 
 Wikipedia:Wikipedia Signpost/2012-07-23/Paid editing, Wikipedia Signpost series, 2012.
 Wikipedia:List of paid editing companies

References 

Types of marketing
Brands